Events in the year 1976 in Norway.

Incumbents
 Monarch – Olav V
 Prime Minister – Trygve Bratteli (Labour Party) until 15 January, then Odvar Nordli (Labour Party)

Events

 15 January – Odvar Nordli becomes Prime Minister of Norway
 15 January – Nordli's Cabinet was appointed.
 18 January – A 6.2-magnitude earthquake occurs in Svalbard.
 25 May – Conscription age in Norway is lowered from 20 to 19 years of age.

Popular culture

Sports

Music

Film

Literature
Karin Bang, poet and novelist, is awarded the Aschehoug Prize literature award.
Finn Carling, novelist, playwright, poet and essayist, is awarded the Gyldendal's Endowment literature prize.

Notable births
 

1 January – Iram Haq, film director.
4 January – Sigbjørn Skåden, novelist.
12 January – Gardar Eide Einarsson, contemporary artist.
14 January – Martin Knold, ice hockey player
20 January – Grete Ellingsen, politician.
22 January – Sivert Høyem, rock singer.
23 January – Anne Margrethe Hausken Nordberg, orienteer.
24 January – Stine Hjermstad Kirkevik, ski orienteer.
25 January – Grete Etholm, athlete.
26 January – Gard Steiro, newspaper editor.
28 January – Gunnar Norebø, footballer
29 January – Anders Baasmo Christiansen, actor.
3 February – Vinni, rapper.
9 February – Marius Molaug, cartoonist and children's writer.
11 February – Simon Stranger, author.
11 February – Kristine Klaveness, rower
13 February – Saint Thomas, musician (died 2007)
13 February – Steffen Sørum, novelist and children's writer.
14 February – Jens Arne Svartedal, cross-country skier.
14 February – Liv Kristine Espenæs, singer
17 February – Svein Berge, electronic musician
18 February – Benny Olsen, footballer
19 February – Solveig Schytz, politician.
19 February – Ingelin Røssland, children's writer.
22 February – Tjodalv, metal musician
22 February – Kristine Bjerknes, rower
25 February – Karl Strømme, jazz trumpeter
26 February – Hilde Hagerup, author.
27 February – Asbjørn Rydland, fantasy writer.
28 February – Audun Grønvold, alpine and freestyle skier
1 March – Andreas Mjøs, musician
2 March – Gina Aspenes, singer
3 March – Torbjørn Anderssen, furniture designer.
3 March – Frode Lafton, footballer
9 March – Pål Strand, footballer
9 March – Herman Vogt, composer
10 March – Ane Brun, singer-songwriter
13 March – Irina Lee, non-fiction writer.
14 March – Christian Michelsen, footballer and manager
15 March – Ole Andreas Nilsen, footballer
16 March – Kjetil Wæhler, footballer.
17 March – Pål Johnsen, ice hockey player
18 March – Espen Solheim, footballer
19 March – Thom Hell, musician.
20 March – Kristian Hammer, Nordic combined skier
21 March – Ingelin Noresjø, politician.
21 March – Geir Moen, cartoonist.
22 March – Marita Sølberg, opera singer.
22 March – Trond Iversen, cross-country skier
23 March – Unni Løvlid, fiddler
26 March – Eirik Verås Larsen, canoeist.
1 April – Tor Egil Horn, footballer
3 April – Claus Mørch, fencer
5 April – Sverre Koren Bjertnæs, painter.
8 April – Gabriel Rasch, cyclist.
9 April – Nils Axle Kanten, cartoonist.
9 April – Sturle Holseter, ski jumper
10 April – Jan Werner Danielsen, singer (died 2006)
11 April – Marta Breen, non-fiction writer.
11 April – Eirik Øwre Thorshaug, politician
12 April – Knut Anders Sørum, singer
12 April – Kenneth Larsen, ice hockey player
15 April – Aldrahn, metal musician
17 April – Dag Haug, linguist
17 April – Kjetil Steensnæs, musician
19 April – Kristian Norheim, politician.
20 April – Cecilie Gotaas Johnsen, cyclist
21 April – Geir Halnes, poet.
24 April – Hedda Berntsen, alpine and freestyle skier
25 April – Karina Hollekim, base jumper.
27 April – Olaf Tufte, rower.
28 April – Ravi, musician.
2 May – Ine Marie Eriksen Søreide, politician.
5 May – Torgeir Ekerholt Sæveraas, historian and novelist.
5 May – Anne Therese Tveter, speed skater
7 May – Anders Juliussen, footballer
8 May – Kim Christiansen, snowboarder
13 May – Kine Elisabeth Steinsvik, Supreme Court justice.
13 May – Lars Nedland, metal musician
14 May – Skatebård, musician.
14 May – Øystein Martinsen, actor
15 May – Gaute Helstrup, footballer
18 May – Jan-Are Larsen, golfer
22 May – Ingrid Storholmen, poet.
24 May – Silje Vige, singer
24 May – Synnøve Macody Lund, actress
26 May – Thomas Røed, footballer
26 May – Johan Mjønes, novelist.
27 May – Guri Størvold, politician.
28 May – Marie-Helene H. Brandsdal, politician.
29 May – Hilde Anita Nyvoll, politician.
31 May – Roar Ljøkelsøy, ski jumper.
1 June – Marius Trygg, ice hockey player
1 June – Mats Trygg, ice hockey player
2 June – Aud Kari Berg, cyclist
3 June – Hilde Louise Asbjørnsen, singer
3 June – Roger Arntzen, jazz bassist
6 June – Ola Borten Moe, politician.
8 June – Gro Kvinlog, alpine skier
12 June – Kristian Brenden, ski jumper
12 June – Zsuzsa Fey, orienteer (born in Romania)
14 June – Brynjard Tristan, metal musician
15 June – Idar Mathiassen, footballer
17 June – Kjetil Møster, jazz musician.
17 June – Stian Johansen, poet.
18 June – Dirge Rep, metal musician
20 June – Maren Hersleth Holsen, politician.
22 June – Silja Ekeland Bjørkly, politician
25 June – Desirée Sparre-Enger, singer (born in the Solomon Islands)
26 June – Mette Davidsen, handball player
27 June – Jarle Bernhoft, musician.
30 June – Zahid Ali, comedian.
1 July – Karoline Borgersen, tennis player
2 July – Simen Berntsen, ski jumper
2 July – Inga Marte Thorkildsen, politician.
5 July – Marthe Scharning Lund, politician.
8 July – Erlend Kaasa, novelist.
14 July – Shabana Rehman, comedian (born in Pakistan).
14 July – Erik Dæhlin, composer
15 July – Guri Solberg, television presenter
15 July – Ragnhild Male Hartviksen, politician.
18 July – Lene Aanes, wrestler.
20 July – Harald Solberg, politician.
23 July – Aleksander Gamme, mountaineer.
23 July – Øyvind Torvund, composer.
26 July – Diaz, rapper.
31 July – Stian Bjørge, speed skater.
6 August – Andreas Gjersøe, canoeist.
7 August – Endre Hellestveit, actor.
8 August – Olaf Olsen, rock drummer.
8 August – Hans Erik Ramberg, footballer
8 August – Kristian Sørli, footballer
8 August – Stian Thomassen, footballer.
9 August – Einar Håndlykken, environmentalist.
9 August – Erlend Flornes Skaret, novelist.
15 August – Sigmund Hagen, politician.
17 August – Anders Rambekk, footballer
18 August – Mala Wang-Naveen, writer.
18 August – Øystein Vidnes, novelist.
24 August – Sondre Krogtoft Larsen, actor.
28 August – Håvard Sakariassen, footballer
4 September – Vegard Sannes, footballer
4 September – Gro-Anita Mykjåland, politician.
7 September – Kim Larsen, footballer
9 September – Kristoffer Rygg, metal musician
13 September – Edward Schultheiss, actor.
17 September – Espen Dietrichson, sculptor
20 September – Espen Grjotheim, musical actor
21 September – Jonas Ueland Kolstad, footballer
22 September – Vidar Vang, musician
22 September – Siri Amalie Oftestad, poet.
25 September – Opaque, rapper.
30 September – Jon Øystein Flink, author.
1 October – Ivar Grydeland, jazz guitarist.
2 October – Ingvild Holvik, novelist.
2 October – Freddy dos Santos, footballer.
8 October – Lars Blixt, footballer
10 October – Kaia Storvik, journalist and politician.
10 October – Stella Getz, singer (born in Nigeria)
10 October – Bård Glad Pedersen, politician.
15 October – Bård Ludvig Thorheim, politician.
15 October – Bergljot Kaslegard, author.
15 October – Tom Kristoffersen, footballer
17 October – Kjartan Salvesen, singer
17 October – Espen Johnsen, politician.
18 October – Galder, metal musician
19 October – Monica Isakstuen, writer.
21 October – Stian Theting, footballer
3 November – Stian Berger Røsland, politician.
8 November – Kristine Edner, footballer
10 November – Steffen Iversen, footballer.
11 November – Lise Selnes, politician.
11 November – Olympia Paus, polo player (born in Greece).
13 November – Nell Sigland, singer
13 November – David Hanssen, footballer
16 November – Øyvind Alapnes, football referee
18 November – Shagrath, metal musician
18 November – Bår Stenvik, non-fiction writer
19 November – Rebekka Karijord, musician and actress.
23 November – Tommy Stenersen, footballer
24 November – Frederik Garshol, footballer
29 November – Elisabeth Hilmo, handball player.
1 December – Agnete Kjølsrud, singer
2 December – Kim Deinoff, footballer
4 December – Ero Stig Karlsen, author.
6 December – Ole Børud, musician.
7 December – Leif Tsolis, football manager
10 December – Margrethe Røed, television presenter
11 December – Børge Hernes, footballer
12 December – Bjørn Vatne, novelist.
14 December – Mudassar Kapur, politician.
14 December – Kari Anne Moe, politician and film director
14 December – Knut Henry Haraldsen, footballer
18 December – Kathrine Maaseide, volleyball player
23 December – Terje Leonardsen, footballer
24 December – Christian Holm-Glad, film director
24 December – Tommy Marthinsen, ice hockey player
28 December – Trond Nymark, race walker.
29 December – Cecilie Seim, novelist and children's writer.

Full date missing
Heidi Aassveen Halvorsen, handball player
Ann Eli Tafjord, cross-country skier
Stian Aarstad, metal musician
Geir Aker, television presenter
Bente Arntsen, powerlifter
Teebee, electronic musician
Arne-Johan Rauan, musician
Thomas Aune, radio presenter
Marco Elsafadi, activist
Lise Finckenhagen, television chef
Stian Floer, chef
Mari Grydeland, writer
Tom Victor Gausdal, chef
Håvard Homstvedt, artist
Benjamin Huseby, photographer
Ingunn Haakonsen, powerlifter
Anders Hoff, comedian and television presenter
Ellen Kathrine Lie, speed skater
Camilla Løw, contemporary artist
Nina Kristin Flo, footballer
Thomas Pettersen, handballer
Ole Rolfsrud, television presenter
Hallvard Notaker, historian
Vanessa Rudjord, magazine editor
Terje Sporsem, standup comedian
Christine Sandtorv, musician
Vibeke Saugestad, musician
Tommy Sharif, businessperson
Marit Strømøy, offshore boat racer
Sigrid Sollund, television presenter
Christina Undhjem, singer
Jonas Wille, handball coach
Kristine Beate Walhovd, neuropsychologist
Håkon Thelin, composer
Mikal Telle, music label owner

Notable deaths
2 January – Leif J. Sverdrup, civil engineer and military officer (b. 1898, died in the US)
17 January – Marie Louise Middelthon, literary critic (b. 1883)
18 January – Folke Bålstad, football referee (b. 1907)
25 January – Gunnar Holmsen, geologist (b. 1880)
30 January – Erik Kristen-Johanssen, jurist and theatre director (b. 1901)
30 January – Håkon Nilsen, naval commander (b. 1913)
5 February – Harald Stenerud, athlete (b. 1897)
5 February – Adolph Wold, footballer (b. 1892)
14 February – Paul René Gauguin, painter (b. 1911, died in Spain)
18 February – Ingemund Berulvson, sculptor (b. 1900)
18 February – Arne Gaupset, wrestler (b. 1894)
20 February – Erling Asbjørn Kjellsby, composer (b. 1901)
24 February – Torbjørn Navelsaker, engineer (b. 1917)
1 March – Bjørn Hougen, archaeologist (b. 1898)
2 March – Narve Bonna, ski jumper (b. 1901)
2 March – Kirsten Heiberg, actress (b. 1907)
7 March – Rolf Kaarby, Nordic combined skier (b. 1909)
8 March – Rolf Otto Andvord, diplomat (b. 1890, died in Spain)
10 March – Einar Ræder, long jumper (b. 1896)
12 March – Petter Carl Reinsnes, politician (b. 1904)
13 March – Max Tau, literary historian (b. 1897)
21 March – Vidar Lindboe-Hansen, ski jumper (b. 1920)
24 March – Arvid Nilssen, actor, revue artist and singer (b. 1913)
28 March – Rolf Rode Koren, politician (b. 1890)
1 April – Lars Søraas, Jr., conductor (b. 1887)
2 April – Birger Hønningstad, aviation engineer (b. 1904)
4 April – Nils Emaus Nilsen, politician (b. 1886)
5 April – Kirsten Brunvoll, writer (b. 1895)
7 April – Oskar Sylte, industrialist (b. 1907).
8 April – Brynjulv Sjetne, politician (b. 1917)
19 April – Tor Hoff, painter (b. 1925)
19 April – Thora Grahl-Nielsen, politician (b. 1901)
20 April – Gunnar G. Helland, fiddlemaker (b. 1889, died in the US)
20 April – Knut Hermundstad, folklorist (b. 1888).
27 April – Edvard Drabløs, actor and theatre director (b. 1883)
29 April – Einar Sommerfeldt, rower (b. 1889)
30 April – Edvard Fliflet Bræin, composer (b. 1924)
5 May – Børre Ulrichsen, architect (b. 1895)
6 May – Sigurd Nørstebø, educationalist (b. 1905).
7 May – Ingemann Torp, industrialist (b. 1894)
7 May – Knut Bengtson, sailor (b. 1919)
9 May – Jens Bjørneboe, writer (b. 1920)
10 May – Elias Aslaksen, religious leader (b. 1888)
12 May – John Norem, politician (b. 1888)
12 May – Sverre Hagerup Bull, composer (b. 1892)
13 May – Jahn Brochmann Halvorsen, diplomat (b. 1916, died in France)
19 May – Tønnes Oksefjell, politician (b. 1901)
19 May – Theo Findahl, teacher and journalist (b. 1891).
20 May – Sigurd H. Jacobsen, politician (b. 1893).
24 May – "Arvid Noe", AIDS victim (b. 1946).
27 May – Jean Heiberg, painter (b. 1884)
28 May – Dagfinn Flem, newspaper editor (b. 1906)
30 May – Niels Ødegaard, politician (b. 1892)
30 May – Ivar Werner Oftedal, mineralogist (b. 1894)
30 May – Reidar Bergh, sport official (b. 1885)
1 June – Karsten Heli, educator (b. 1898)
2 June – Trygve Diskerud, harness racer (b. 1903)
5 June – Asbjørg Borgfelt, sculptor (b. 1900)
5 June – Martin P. Vangsli, cross-country skier (b. 1903)
6 June – Øivin Davidsen, rower (b. 1891)
6 June – Ragnar Danielsen, bandleader (b. 1917)
8 June – Thorleif Schjelderup-Ebbe, scentist (b. 1894)
9 June – Thorleif Paus, consul (b. 1881)
11 June – Edith Meisel Aas, sculptor (b. 1927)
16 June – Ingrid Sandvik, politician (b. 1921)
17 June – Leif Rustad, musician and radio presenter (b. 1903)
18 June – Ingrid Christensen, explorer
19 June – Peder Ree Pedersen, politician (b. 1913)
24 June – Kåre Bergstrøm, film director (b. 1911)
27 June – Peter Bloch, athlete (b. 1923)
30 June – Thorvald Heggem, Nordic combined skier (b. 1907)
2 July – Per Wollebæk, author (b. 1910)
4 July – Håkon Hoff, newspaper editor and politician (b. 1898)
8 July – Dagfin Hermansen, painter (b. 1892)
11 July – Edith Aas, painter (b. 1924)
12 July – Borghild Berge Lexow, painter (b. 1898)
13 July – Einar Brun, marine biologist (b. 1936)
19 July – Oliver Dahl-Goli, politician (b. 1897)
28 July – Aksel Floer, sport official (b. 1901).
30 July – Sverre Offenberg Løberg, politician (b. 1905)
2 August – Elias E. Marøy, fishers' leader and politician (b. 1885)
3 August – Emil Lie, sculptor (b. 1897)
4 August – Hans Magnus Andresen, alpine skier (b. 1929)
5 August – Ole Mørk Sandvik, musicologist (b. 1875)
17 August – Andreas Eriksen, author (b. 1915)
19 August – Olav Kristian Strømme, priest and philanthropist (b. 1907)
19 August – Ole Grepp, actor (b. 1914)
26 August – Sigurd Eriksen, painter (b. 1884)
27 August – Herman Ruge, educationalist (b. 1883)
28 August – Einar Aaser, physician (b. 1886).
29 August – John Marius Trana, politician (b. 1898)
1 September – Bjørn Bjørnseth, equestrian (b. 1919)
4 September – Sverre Bernhard Nybø, politician (b. 1903)
4 September – Thoralf Evje, civil servant (b. 1902)
6 September – Berit Brænne, children's writer (b. 1918)
7 September – Birger Halvorsen, high jumper (b. 1905)
8 September – Helge Refsum, politician (b. 1897)
10 September – Lisbeth Nyborg, actress (b. 1887)
12 September – Hilmar Stigum, folklorist (b. 1897)
15 September – Carl Jacob Arnholm, legal scholar (b. 1899)
19 September – Erling Michelsen, wrestler (b. 1899)
20 September – Gudmund Didrik Schnitler, military officer (b. 1897).
21 September – Jens Salvesen, sailor (b. 1883)
24 September – Johannes Heimbeck, physician (b. 1892)
25 September – Gjermund Haugen, fiddler (b. 1914)
29 September – Nils Larsen, whaler (b. 1900)
4 October – Karl Trasti, politician (b. 1917)
5 October – Ragna Steinberg, painter (b. 1925)
11 October – Lars Onsager, physical chemist and theoretical physicist (b.1903, died in the US)
14 October – Agvald Gjelsvik, educator (b. 1907)
16 October – Rasmus Breistein, film director (b. 1890, died in the US)
20 October – Christian Bernt Apenes, judge (b. 1889)
20 October – Kristian Langlo, politician (b. 1894)
23 October – Eivind Thon, newspaper editor (b. 1889)
28 October – Arve Moen, writer (b. 1912)
29 October – Max Herseth, rower (b. 1892, died in the US)
29 October – Kristian Moljord, politician (b. 1882)
30 October – Karianne Christiansen, alpine skier (b. 1949)
1 November – Oscar Egede-Nissen, actor (b. 1903)
13 November – Bjarne Eriksen, businessman (b. 1886)
14 November – Leif Jarmann Wilhelmsen, civil servant (b. 1910, died in Kenya)
15 November – Einar Molland, theologian (b. 1908)
27 November – Sven Arntzen, barrister (b. 1897, died in France)
25 November – Jens E. Ekornes, businessperson (b. 1908)
2 December – Gunnar Rollefsen, marine biologist (b. 1899)
7 December – Finn Lange, actor (b. 1895)
9 December – Thor Jensen, gymnast (b. 1880)
12 December – Steinar Hauge, veterinarian (b. 1914)
15 December – Aagot Gjems Guthormsen, politician (b. 1890)
15 December – Henrik A. Broch, diplomat (b. 1909)
17 December – Erling Larsson, politician (b. 1905)
18 December – Ole E. Nilsedalen, politician (b. 1905)
21 December – Odd Sørli, resistance member (b. 1912).
22 December – Guido Schjølberg, painter (b. 1886)
23 December – Kristian Fjeld, politician (b. 1887)
24 December – Rolf Erling "Rottenikken" Knutsen, criminal (b. 1912)
24 December – Monrad Norderval, bishop (b. 1902)
26 December – Bjarne Hansen, painter (b. 1890)
27 December – Ludvig G. Braathen, shipping and airline magnate (b. 1891)
29 December – Erik Eriksen, printmaker (b. 1923)

See also

References

External links